Samuel "Sam" Ervin Beam (born July 26, 1974), better known by his stage name Iron & Wine, is an American singer-songwriter. He has released six studio albums, several EPs and singles, as well as a few download-only releases, which include a live album (a recording of his 2005 Bonnaroo performance). He occasionally tours with a full band.

Beam was raised in South Carolina before moving to Virginia and then Florida to attend school. He now resides in Durham, North Carolina. The name Iron & Wine is taken from a dietary supplement named "Beef, Iron & Wine" that he found in a general store while shooting a film.

Early life
Beam was raised in Chapin, South Carolina, where his father worked in land management and his mother was a schoolteacher. When he was a child, his family took regular trips to the country, where his grandfather ran a farm. He attended Seven Oaks Elementary School and Chapin High School. While home from college, he was a waiter at California Dreaming restaurant in Columbia. Beam earned a bachelor's degree in art from Virginia Commonwealth University in Richmond, Virginia. He specialized in painting before graduating from the Florida State University Film School with an MFA degree. Before the release of the first Iron & Wine album, Beam's main source of income was as a professor of film and cinematography at the University of Miami and Miami International University of Art & Design. He had been writing songs for over seven years before a friend lent him a four-track recorder. He began making demos and gave one to his friend Michael Bridwell, brother of Band of Horses lead singer, Ben Bridwell. Michael handed it to Mike McGonigal, editor of Yeti magazine, who chose "Dead Man's Will", later released on In the Reins, for inclusion on one of his magazine's compilation CDs. Beam later came to the attention of Sub Pop Records co-owner, Jonathan Poneman, who contacted Beam to propose a deal.

Musical career
Beam released his first Iron & Wine album, The Creek Drank the Cradle, on the Sub Pop label in 2002. Beam wrote, performed, recorded and produced the album in his home studio. Featuring acoustic guitars, banjo, and slide guitar, the album's music has been compared to that of Nick Drake, Simon and Garfunkel, Elliott Smith, Neil Young and John Fahey.

Also in 2002, Beam recorded a cover of The Postal Service's then-unreleased song "Such Great Heights". Rather than being included on an Iron & Wine release, the track was initially included as a b-side of the original version by The Postal Service. It was later included on the B-sides and rarities album, Around the Well. He then followed up on his debut album in 2003 with The Sea & The Rhythm, an EP containing other home-recorded tracks with a similar style to the songs on the debut.

Beam's second full-length album, Our Endless Numbered Days (2004), was recorded in a professional studio with a significant increase in fidelity. Produced in Chicago by Brian Deck, the focus was still on acoustic material, but the inclusion of other band members gave rise to a slightly different sound. That same year, he recorded the song "The Trapeze Swinger" for the film In Good Company, and had his version of "Such Great Heights" featured in an advertisement for M&M's and in the film and soundtrack for Garden State. This version was later used in a 2006 Ask.com advertisement, and eventually released as a single in 2006 backed with recordings of "The Trapeze Swinger" and "Naked as We Came" made for Radio Vienna.

In February 2005, he released an EP entitled Woman King, which expanded on the sounds of his previous LP with the addition of electric guitars. Each track features a spiritual female figure, and had subtle Biblical undertones.

The EP In the Reins, a collaboration with the Arizona-based rock band Calexico, was released in September 2005. Beam wrote all of the EP's songs years earlier, but Calexico added their trademark fusion of southwestern rock, traditional Mexican music and jazz to the songs' arrangements. Several tracks, most notably, "Burn That Broken Bed", feature brass instruments, a first for Beam's music.

The third full-length Iron & Wine album, entitled The Shepherd's Dog, was released September 25, 2007. This album was voted one of the ten best of 2007 by Paste magazine. Contributors included Joey Burns and Paul Niehaus of Calexico, as well as jazz musicians Matt Lux and Bob Burger. When asked to describe the album to The Independent, Beam remarked that "it's not a political propaganda record, but it's definitely inspired by political confusion, because I was really taken aback when Bush got reelected."

Beam has released most of his music on iTunes, including several exclusive EPs. The Iron & Wine iTunes Exclusive EP features unreleased studio recordings, including a Stereolab cover and two tracks which had previously only appeared on vinyl. The Live Session (iTunes Exclusive) features Beam and his sister, Sarah Beam, performing a number of tracks from his albums, as well as a cover of New Order's "Love Vigilantes". Sarah Beam has contributed backing vocals on many of Beam's studio recordings.

Beam's music has appeared in television series such as Grey's Anatomy, The L Word and House M.D. "Flightless Bird, American Mouth" was used in the film Twilight. The song was specifically chosen for the film's prom scene by Kristen Stewart, the female lead, and appears on the film's soundtrack.

The B-sides and rarities album Around the Well was released in 2009. Iron & Wine also contributed the song "Stolen Houses (Die)" to the AIDS benefit album Dark Was the Night produced by the Red Hot Organization.

On November 26, 2010 Iron & Wine released a special edition Record Store Day Black Friday 12" vinyl and CD single called, Walking Far From Home for independent record stores.

Kiss Each Other Clean, Iron & Wine's fourth full-length album, was released on January 25, 2011 on Warner Bros. Records in North America and 4AD for the rest of the world. With this album, Beam blended his earlier styles with a stronger pop influence.

Ghost on Ghost, Iron & Wine's fifth studio album, was released in April 2013 on Nonesuch Records in North America and 4AD for the rest of the world. Ghost on Ghost marked a further exploration into the pop sounds of Kiss Each Other Clean while also exhibiting jazz and R&B influences, with jazz drummer Brian Blade contributing to the album. In January 2014, recording during the polar vortex in Chicago, Beam and his regular collaborator Brian Deck co-produced eight of the ten songs on Chadwick Stokes' 2015 album The Horse Comanche. Beam contributed the Iron & Wine band to the sessions and sang backing vocals.

Iron & Wine released two albums in 2015. Archive Series: Volume 1, released in February, featured unreleased songs recorded during the same period as The Creek Drank the Cradle. Covers album,  Sing Into My Mouth, recorded with Band of Horses singer Ben Bridwell, was released in July. Love Letter for Fire, an album of duets with American singer-songwriter Jesca Hoop, was released in 2016 on Sub Pop. Produced, recorded, and mixed by Tucker Martine, the album also featured contributions from Wilco's Glenn Kotche, Rob Burger, Eyvind Kang, Sebastian Steinberg, and Edward Rankin-Parker.

In August 2017, Iron & Wine's sixth studio album Beast Epic was released through Sub Pop Records. The record saw Beam strip back the production and array of instruments from previous records to return to more simple and melodic song structures.

On March 21, 2019, Calexico and Iron & Wine announced Years to Burn, their first collaboration album. It was released on June 14, 2019 via Sub Pop.

Personal life
Beam, his wife Kim, and their five daughters live in Durham, North Carolina. He was raised in the Bible belt as a Christian, but is now an agnostic: "That was a confusing time for me, but I don't miss being misled. I'm not an atheist. There's an undeniable unseen world that some people call God and think they know more about than other people. I try not to get hung up on the names."

In 2011, a portrait of Beam was painted by British artist Joe Simpson. The painting was exhibited around the UK, including in a solo exhibition at The Royal Albert Hall.

Discography

Albums

EPs

Singles
 "Call Your Boys" b/w "Dearest Forsaken" via Sub Pop Singles Club (CD + Clear 7" Vinyl) (2002)
 "No Moon" b/w "Sinning Hands" (Limited 7" Vinyl Bonus with first Pressing of Our Endless Numbered Days) (2004)
 "Passing Afternoon" (CD only) (2004)
 "The Trapeze Swinger" (iTunes only) (2005)
 "Such Great Heights" (UK only CD) (2006)
"Arms of a Thief / Serpent Charmer" (2007)
 "Boy with a Coin" b/w "Carried Home" and "Kingdom of the Animals" (CD + UK only 10" Vinyl) (2007)
 "Dark Eyes" (Bob Dylan cover w/ Calexico) (2007)
 "Lovesong of the Buzzard" (CD + UK only 10" Vinyl) (2008)
 "Flightless Bird, American Mouth" (2008), BPI: Silver
"Love Vigilantes" (2009)
 "Walking Far from Home" (2010)
"Me And Lazarus" (2011)
"Tree by the River" (2011)
"Time After Time" (2016)
"Call It Dreaming" (2017)
"Bitter Truth" (2017)
"Song in Stone" (2017)

Music videos 
 "Southern Anthem" (2002)
 "Lion's Mane" (2002)
 "Boy with a Coin" (2007)
 "Joy" (2013)
 "Call It Dreaming" (2017)
 "Thomas County Law" (2017)
 "Bitter Truth" (2018)
 "Last Night" (2018)

Other contributions
 The Six Parts Seven's Lost Notes from Forgotten Songs (2003) – "Sleeping Diagonally"
 The O.C. Soundtrack (2004) – "The Sea & the Rhythm"
 Garden State Soundtrack (2004) – "Such Great Heights"
 Sweetheart: Love Songs (2004) – "Ab's Song" (The Marshall Tucker Band cover)
 L Word: Season Two Soundtrack (2004) – "Naked as We Came"
 Grey's Anatomy: Season Two Soundtrack (2004) – "Naked as We Came"
 In Good Company (2004) – "Naked as We Came," "Sunset Soon Forgotten," "The Trapeze Swinger"
 Fighting in a Sack (2004) – "New Slang (Featuring Iron & Wine) [Live]"
 KCRW Sounds Eclectic Volume 3 (2005) – "Waitin' for a Superman" (Flaming Lips cover)
 I Am a Cold Rock. I Am Dull Grass. (2006) – "We All, Us Three, Will Ride"
 I'm Not There Soundtrack (2007) – "Dark Eyes" (with Calexico)
 The Road Mix Volume 3, music from One Tree Hill (2007) – "He Lays in the Reins" (with Calexico)
 Acoustic 07 (2007) – "Naked as We Came"
 Numb3rs Season 3, Episode 19, "Pandora's Box" (2007) – "Naked as We Came"
 Friday Night Lights Season 1, Episode 12 (2007) – "Upward Over the Mountain"
 Friday Night Lights: Original Television Soundtrack (2007) – "Dead Man's Will" (with Calexico)
 Twilight Soundtrack (2008) – "Flightless Bird, American Mouth"
 90210 Season 1, Episode 18, "Off the Rails" (2008) – "Cinder & Smoke"
 House M.D.
 Season 4, Episode 16 (Season Finale, Part 2) "Wilson's Heart" (2008) – "Passing Afternoon"
 Season 6, Episode 1 (Season Premiere, Part 1) "Broken" (2009) – "Love Vigilantes" (New Order cover)
 Dark Was the Night (2009) – "Stolen Houses (Die)"
 Ugly Betty Season 3, Episode 16 (2009) – "Naked as We Came"
 The Mysteries of Pittsburgh (2009) – "Naked as We Came"
 Misfits Season 1, Episode 6 (2009) – "Such Great Heights"
 TiMER  (2009) – "The Trapeze Swinger"
 The Last Song Soundtrack (2010) – "Each Coming Night"
 Degrassi Season 10, Episode 31, "Halo, Part 2" (2010) – "Passing Afternoon"
 Twilight Saga: Breaking Dawn – Part 1 Soundtrack (2011) – "Flightless Bird, American Mouth (wedding version)"
 The Lone Ranger: Wanted (Music Inspired by the Film) (2013) – "Rattling Bone"

References

External links

 Official site

1974 births
Living people
21st-century American guitarists
21st-century American singers
21st-century American male singers
4AD artists
American agnostics
American folk guitarists
American folk singers
American male guitarists
American male singer-songwriters
American rock guitarists
American rock singers
American rock songwriters
Fingerstyle guitarists
Florida State University alumni
Gothic country musicians
Guitarists from South Carolina
Indie folk musicians
Musicians from Durham, North Carolina
People from Chapin, South Carolina
Sub Pop artists
Singer-songwriters from South Carolina
Singer-songwriters from North Carolina
One-man bands